The 1955–56 NBA season was the Royals eighth season in the NBA.

Regular season

Season standings

x – clinched playoff spot

Record vs. opponents

Game log

Player statistics

Awards and records
 Maurice Stokes, NBA Rookie of the Year Award
 Maurice Stokes, All-NBA Second Team

References

Sacramento Kings seasons
Rochester
Rochester Royals
Rochester Royals